A wrong number is a telephone number dialed incorrectly. Wrong number may also refer to:

Films
 Wrong Number (1959 film), a British film directed by Vernon Sewell
 Wrong Number (2004 film), a Bangladeshi film
 "Wrong Number", two different episodes from ChuckleVision, 1992, 2001
 "Wrong Number", an episode from Diagnosis: Murder, 1998
 Wrong No., a Pakistani film, 2015

Music
 "Wrong Number" (The Cure song), 1997
 "Wrong Number" (George Jones song), 1964
 "Wrong Number", by Timothy B. Schmit from Playin' It Cool, 1984
 "Wrong Number", by TVXQ from Mirotic, 2008

Other arts, entertainment, and media
 Wrong Number, a comic strip by Vince Evans
 The Wrong Number, a novel of Fear Street book series by R. L. Stine, 1990
 Hotline Miami 2: Wrong Number, a video game, 2015